The Yan Oya is the fifth-longest river of Sri Lanka. Its catchment area receives approximately 2,371 million cubic metres of rain per year, and approximately 17 percent of the water reaches the sea. It has a catchment area of 1,520 square kilometres.

References 

Bodies of water of Anuradhapura District
Bodies of water of Trincomalee District
Rivers of Sri Lanka